C. danae may refer to:
 Callinectes danae, a crab species
 Chauliodus danae, a fish species
 Cirrobrachium danae, a squid species
 Colotis danae, a butterfly species

See also
 Danae (disambiguation)